Volutomitra blanfordi is a species of small sea snail, marine gastropod mollusk in the family Volutomitridae.

Description

Distribution
This marine species occurs in the Gulf of Oman.

References

 Salisbury, R. A. & Gori, S. (2019). Six new Volutomitridae species from the Arabian seas and transfer of two Costellariidae species to Volutomitridae (Gastropoda: Volutomitridae). Acta Conchyliorum. 18: 103-124.

External links
 Melvill, J. C. & Standen, R. (1901). The Mollusca of the Persian Gulf, Gulf of Oman and Arabian Seas as evidenced mainly through the collections of Mr. F. W. Townsend, 1893-1900, with descriptions of new species. Part 1, Cephalopoda, Gastropoda, Scaphopoda. Proceedings of the Zoological Society of London. 1901 (2): 327-460

blanfordi
Gastropods described in 1901